Larry Agajanian is a former American football player. He played at the defensive tackle position for the UCLA Bruins football team from 1966 to 1968. He was selected by the AP, UPI, and Pac-8 coaches as a first-team player on the 1968 All-Pacific-8 Conference football team. He was also selected in January 1969 as the Armenian American Intercollegiate Player of the Year. He was drafted by the Green Bay Packers in the seventh round (168th pick) of the 1969 NFL Draft but did not appear in any regular season games with the club.

His father Ben Agajanian played professional football in the National Football League (NFL) and American Football League (AFL) from 1945 to 1964.

References

Living people
American football quarterbacks
USC Trojans football players
Players of American football from California
Year of birth missing (living people)